Dudley Tyler (born 21 September 1944) is an English former footballer, born in Salisbury, who played as a winger in the Football League for West Ham United and Hereford United.

Career
John Charles signed Tyler for Hereford United in 1969 from amateur football in Swindon; he had previously been rejected by several clubs due to him having a hole in his heart. He was part of the team that famously knocked Newcastle United out of the FA Cup, and gained election to the Football League in 1972. Tyler subsequently signed for West Ham United for a then non-league record fee of £25,000. He made just 29 league appearances in one-and-a-half seasons, his only league goal for the club scored against Peter Shilton. He returned to Hereford in November 1973, eventually reaching a total of 329 competitive appearances for the club with 69 goals scored.

After retiring from professional football, he joined non league Malvern Town, eventually becoming player-manager, followed by stints at Westfields and Pegasus Juniors in Hereford, both playing and managing. He worked as a salesman for a plastics company. As of 2016, Tyler still lived in Hereford.

References

External links
 
 Stats and photo at Sporting Heroes

1944 births
Living people
Sportspeople from Salisbury
Sportspeople from Hereford
English footballers
Association football midfielders
Hereford United F.C. players
West Ham United F.C. players
Malvern Town F.C. players
Westfields F.C. players
Hereford Pegasus F.C. players
Southern Football League players
English Football League players
Malvern Town F.C. managers
Westfields F.C. managers
Pegasus Juniors F.C. managers
English football managers
20th-century English people
21st-century English people